Rivoglitazone (INN) is a thiazolidinedione derivative undergoing research for use in the treatment of type 2 diabetes.

It is being developed by Daiichi Sankyo.

References

Thiazolidinediones
Benzimidazoles
Phenol ethers